The following is the list of Western Michigan Broncos head football coaches. The Western Michigan Broncos football team represents Western Michigan University (WMU) in the National Collegiate Athletic Association (NCAA) Football Bowl Subdivision. WMU has fielded a football team since 1906.

The Broncos have had 16 head coaches in their history. William H. Spaulding and Al Molde have the most wins in WMU history with 62. WMU has three conference championships and has competed in eight bowl games, winning one and losing seven.

Key

Head coaches
Through the 2022 regular season

References

Lists of college football head coaches
 
Michigan sports-related lists